Richard Denys (c. 1525 – 1593/94), of Cold Ashton, Gloucestershire, was an English politician.

Family
Denys was the eldest son of Sir Walter Denys, who was well known in local public affairs, by his first wife. His inheritance did not match his family's social standing. Denys married, by 1557, Anne St John, a daughter of the MP Sir John St. John of Bletsoe, Bedfordshire. Together they had four sons and six daughters.

Career
He was a Member (MP) of the Parliament of England for Bath in 1547 and for Gloucestershire in 1563. 
When Denys was elected in 1547, so was his uncle, Maurice Denys. His brothers-in-law, Oliver St. John and Francis Russell, joined them.

References

1525 births
1590s deaths
People from South Gloucestershire District
English MPs 1547–1552
English MPs 1563–1567